Top Gear Rally 2 is a racing video game developed by  Saffire and released for the Nintendo 64 in 1999. It is a sequel to Top Gear Rally.

Gameplay
Top Gear Rally 2 is a racing game where players drive rally cars through a series of tracks. The game features a random and dynamic weather system.

Development
Unlike the original Top Gear Rally, which was developed by Boss Game Studios, Top Gear Rally 2 was developed by Saffire. The company conceived Top Gear Rally 2 as a more realistic game than its predecessor, with more simulation-like elements such as real-time car damage and weather effects. The physics engine was completely rewritten. All the vehicles in the game are licensed versions of real rally cars such as the Ford Focus and the Renault Alpine. During the final stages of the development cycle, developers had to work between 16 and 18 hours a day to complete the game. The game supports the Nintendo 64 Expansion Pak, which allows the game to be played at a resolution of 480x480 pixels.

Reception

Top Gear Rally 2 received "average" reviews, according to the review aggregation website GameRankings. Mike Wolf of Next Generation praised the game, stating that "with 15 cars to choose from, realistic weather conditions that actually affect car handling, a paint shop for customization, shortcuts to find and exploit, and multiplayer support for as many as four players, this game is a must-have for any N64 racing fan". N64 Magazine considered it the best rally game for the Nintendo 64, but not as rewarding as World Driver Championship.

References

External links

1999 video games
Kemco games
Nintendo 64 games
Nintendo 64-only games
Off-road racing video games
Video game sequels
Video games developed in the United States
Saffire games
Top Gear (video game series)